Li Xiaoming (born 5 February 1958) is a Chinese skier. He competed at the 1980 Winter Olympics and the 1984 Winter Olympics.

References

External links
 

1958 births
Living people
Chinese male biathletes
Chinese male cross-country skiers
Olympic biathletes of China
Olympic cross-country skiers of China
Biathletes at the 1980 Winter Olympics
Cross-country skiers at the 1984 Winter Olympics
Skiers from Hebei
Sport shooters from Hebei
People from Langfang